The C&C 99 is an American sailboat, that was designed by Tim Jackett and entered production in 2002.

Production
The boat was built by C&C Yachts in the United States, but it is now out of production.

Design

The C&C 99 is a small recreational keelboat, built predominantly with from fiberglass. It has a masthead sloop rig, an internally-mounted spade-type rudder and a fixed fin keel.

The design had a choice of keels. The deep draft keel was later removed as an option.

The design was originally delivered with aluminum spars, but this was later changed to carbon fiber.

The boat is fitted with a Volvo 2020SD  diesel inboard engine.

The boat has a PHRF racing average handicap of 102 with a high of 108 and low of 96.

See also
List of sailing boat types

Similar sailboats
Bayfield 30/32
B-Boats B-32
Beneteau Oceanis 321
C&C 32
Catalina 320
Douglas 32
Hunter 32
Hunter 326
J/32
Mirage 32
Nonsuch 324
Ontario 32
Ranger 32

References

Keelboats
2000s sailboat type designs
Sailing yachts
Sailboat type designs by Tim Jackett
Sailboat types built by C&C Yachts